Stempfferia boormani, the Boorman's epitola, is a butterfly in the family Lycaenidae. It is found in eastern Nigeria. The habitat consists of forests.

References

Butterflies described in 1999
Poritiinae
Endemic fauna of Nigeria
Butterflies of Africa